Across the Zodiac: The Story of a Wrecked Record (1880) is a science fiction novel by Percy Greg, who has been credited as an originator of the sword and planet subgenre of science fiction.

Plot 
The book details the creation and use of apergy, a form of anti-gravitational energy, and details a flight to Mars in 1830. The planet is inhabited by diminutive beings; they are convinced that life does not exist elsewhere than on their world, and refuse to believe that the unnamed narrator is actually from Earth. (They think he is an unusually tall Martian from some remote place on their planet.)

The book's narrator names his spacecraft the Astronaut.

Novel concepts 
The book contains what was probably the first alien language in any work of fiction. His space ship design also featured a small garden, an early prediction of hydroponics.

Influence 
The same title was used for a later, similar book—Across the Zodiac: A Story of Adventure (1896) by Edwin Pallander (1869–1952) (the pseudonym of UK biologist, botanist and author Lancelot Francis Sanderson Bayly). Pallander copied some elements of Greg's plot; in his book, gravity is negated by a gyroscope.

See also 

 Annals of the Twenty-Ninth Century
 A Journey in Other Worlds

References

External links 
 Across the Zodiac at Internet Archive (scanned books original editions color illustrated)
 

Fiction set in 1830
1880 British novels
1880 science fiction novels
British science fiction novels
Space exploration novels
Novels set on Mars
Novels set in the 1830s
Planetary romances